Noel Maxam (born September 26) is an American television director, writer, and producer. Maxam has worked on the CBS Daytime drama As the World Turns as a writer, and, later, on The Young and the Restless where he transitioned the show to non-linear editing and hi-definition. As  Associate Producer, he ran post production and directed for over 10 years.  In 2007, he left to work as Producer on the NBC drama Days of Our Lives and was promoted to Co-Executive Producer in 2011.  In 2012, he left Days and turned to freelance directing and started a company, Emagispace. Since the companies founding, Noel has advised other startups - most notably Pluto.tv which was purchased by Viacom in 2019.  As a freelancer, Maxam has directed for The Young and the Restless, Hollywood Heights, Days of Our Lives and Disney.  Noel Maxam is a graduate of the Interlochen Arts Academy (Diploma), Carnegie Mellon University (B.F.A. Directing) and the University of Southern California  (M.F.A. in Film and Video Production).

Positions held 
Disney 
 Director, International Promotions and Commercials

Hollywood Heights
 Director (Season 1)

Days of Our Lives
 Co-Executive Producer (fall 2011 - January 27, 2012)
 Supervising Producer (January 16, 2009 - fall 2011)
 Producer (September 10, 2007 - January 2009)
 Director (September 21, 2007 - fall 2011; 2015–present)

The Young and the Restless
 Director (1999 - September 11, 2007; December 16, 2011 – Present)
 Associate Director (1997-1999)

As the World Turns
 Associate Writer (1995-1997)

Awards and nominations
Daytime Emmy Award
Nomination, 2012, Outstanding Drama Series, "Days of Our Lives"
Nomination, 2009, Outstanding Drama Series, "Days of Our Lives"
Nomination, 2009, Directing Team, Days of Our Lives
Nomination, 2000, 2004-2006, Directing Team, The Young and the Restless
Win, 1998, 1999, 2001, 2002, Directing Team, The Young and the Restless

Directors Guild of America Award

2009	Nominated	DGA Award	 Outstanding Directorial Achievement in Daytime Serials
for: "Days of Our Lives" (1965)
For episode #10,763.
 
2000	Nominated	DGA Award	 Outstanding Directorial Achievement in Daytime Serials
for: "The Young and the Restless" (1973)
For episode #6632.

Executive Producing History

External links

Soap opera producers
American television directors
American television producers
Living people
Year of birth missing (living people)